Donald Wayne Powers (November 14, 1944 – December 4, 2017) was an American football coach. He was the 20th head football coach at The Citadel, serving for five seasons, from 1996 to 2000, and compiling a record of 19–36. He also served as an assistant coach, working principally with linebackers and defensive backs, and as a defensive coordinator, at Western Carolina (in two stints), Western Kentucky, and East Carolina.

Head coaching record

References

1944 births
2017 deaths
The Citadel Bulldogs football coaches
East Carolina Pirates football coaches
Western Carolina Catamounts football players
Western Carolina Catamounts football coaches
Western Kentucky Hilltoppers football coaches